Marcus Popilius Laenas is the name of two Roman consuls

Marcus Popillius Laenas (consul 173 BC)
Marcus Popillius Laenas (consul 359 BC)